The 2014 FIBA Europe Under-16 Championship for Women was the 26th edition of the FIBA Europe Under-16 Championship for Women. 16 teams featured in the competition, held in Debrecen, Hungary, from 31 July to 10 August 2014.

Participating teams

  (3rd place, 2013 FIBA Europe Under-16 Championship for Women Division B)

  (Runners-up, 2013 FIBA Europe Under-16 Championship for Women Division B)

  (Winners, 2013 FIBA Europe Under-16 Championship for Women Division B)

First round
The first-round groups draw took place on 1 December 2013 in Freising, Germany. In the first round, the sixteen teams were allocated in four groups of four teams each. The top three teams of each group will qualify for the Second Round. The last team of each group will play in the Classification Group G first, then in the 9th – 16th place playoffs.

Group A

|}

Group B

|}

Group C

|}

Group D

|}

Second round
Twelve advancing teams from the First Round are allocated in two groups of six teams each. The top four teams of each group will advance to the quarterfinals. The last two teams of each group will play in the 9th – 16th place playoffs against the teams from the Group G.

Group E

|}

Group F

|}

Classification Group G
The last team of each group of the First Round will compete in this classification round.

|}

9th – 16th place playoffs

Classification games for 13th – 16th place

Classification games for 9th – 12th place

1st – 8th place playoffs

Quarterfinals

Classification games for 5th – 8th place

Semifinals

Final classification games

Match for 15th place

Match for 13th place

Match for 11th place

Match for 9th place

Match for 7th place

Match for 5th place

Bronze medal match

Final

Final standings

References

External links
Official Site
AllSportDB.com Event Page

2014
2014–15 in European women's basketball
2014–15 in Hungarian basketball
International youth basketball competitions hosted by Hungary
International women's basketball competitions hosted by Hungary
2014 in youth sport
Sport in Debrecen